The fifth and final season of the television series Angel, the spin-off of Buffy the Vampire Slayer, premiered on October 1, 2003 on The WB and concluded its 22-episode season and its television run on May 19, 2004. The season aired on Wednesdays at 9:00 pm ET. This was the first and only season of Angel to air following the finale of Buffy the Vampire Slayer.

Cast and characters

Main cast 
 David Boreanaz as Angel
 James Marsters as Spike
 J. August Richards as Charles Gunn
 Amy Acker as Winifred "Fred" Burkle/Illyria
 Andy Hallett as Lorne
 Mercedes McNab as Harmony Kendall
 Alexis Denisof as Wesley Wyndam-Pryce

Recurring cast

Special guest star 
 Charisma Carpenter as Cordelia Chase

Guest cast 
 Julie Benz as Darla
 Jack Conley as Sahjhan
 Julia Lee as Anne Steele

Crew 
Series creator Joss Whedon served as executive producer, now able to concentrate more on Angel as both Buffy the Vampire Slayer and Firefly ended. Whedon wrote and directed two episodes throughout the season ("Conviction" and "A Hole in the World"), co-wrote the story for "Smile Time" and co-wrote (as well as directed a number of scenes of) the series finale, "Not Fade Away". Whedon was originally intended to direct the final episode of the show but his commitments to filming Serenity (the sequel film to Firefly) made it impossible for him to do so. He delegated the task to showrunner Jeffrey Bell who also wrote the episode alongside Whedon. Bell would write and direct only one other episode of the season.

After Buffy ended, David Fury joined the writing staff full-time as co-executive producer, later promoted to executive producer midseason, and wrote or co-wrote four episodes, including writing and directing the 100th episode. Buffy writer Drew Goddard also joined the staff as executive story editor and wrote or co-wrote five episodes. Steven S. DeKnight was promoted to producer, later promoted to supervising producer midseason, and wrote or co-wrote six episodes, two of which he directed. Ben Edlund was promoted to supervising producer and wrote or co-wrote four episodes, including writing and directing "Smile Time". Elizabeth Craft and Sarah Fain were promoted to executive story editors and wrote three episodes. Brent Fletcher, who was a script coordinator, wrote one episode, which was directed by series star David Boreanaz.

Co-creator David Greenwalt, who had left Angel in an official capacity at the end of season three, came back to direct the antepenultimate episode of the series, "The Girl in Question".

Episodes

Cancellation 
On February 14, 2004, the WB Network announced that Angel would not be brought back for a sixth season. The one-paragraph statement indicated that the news, which had been reported by an Internet site the previous day, had been leaked well before the network intended to make its announcement. Joss Whedon posted a message on a popular fan site, The Bronze: Beta, in which he expressed his dismay and surprise, saying he was "heartbroken" and described the situation as "Healthy Guy Falls Dead From Heart Attack." Fan reaction was to organize letter-writing campaigns, online petitions, blood and food drives, advertisements in trade magazines and via mobile billboards, and attempts to lobby other networks (UPN was a favorite target, as it had already picked up Buffy). Outrage for the cancellation focused on Jordan Levin, WB's Head of Entertainment. It was the second highest-rated program to be canceled on the WB.

Writer and producer David Fury "guarantees" that if Joss Whedon hadn't requested an early renewal Angel would have been back for a season six:The only reason that Angel didn't come back...it's a very simple thing. Because our ratings were up, because of our critical attention, Joss specifically asked Jordan Levin, who was the head of The WB at the time, to give us an early pick-up because every year they [would] wait so long to give Angel a pick-up [and] a lot of us [would] turn down jobs hoping that Angel will continue – he [Joss] didn't want that to happen. So, he was feeling very confident and he [Joss] just asked Jordan, "Like, make your decision now whether you're going to pick us up or not," and Jordan, sort of with his hands tied, with his back up against the wall, called him the next day and said, "Okay, we're canceling you." Jordan's no longer there and The WB has since recognized...I believe Garth Ancier at The WB said that it was a big mistake to cancel Angel. There was a power play that happened that just didn't fall out the way they wanted it to. We wanted to get an early pick-up, we didn't. In fact we forced them [The WB] to make a decision, and with his hand forced he [Levin] made the decision to cancel us.

I guarantee that, if we waited as we normally did, by the time May had come around they would have picked up Angel. I can guarantee that.

Reception 
The fifth season has a 93% on Rotten Tomatoes based on 14 reviews, with an average rating of 8 out 10. The site's critics consensus reads, "Angels final season concludes the series with a creative resurgence that restores the show's signature blend of humor and horror, ending on a bittersweet high note that should satisfy fans while leaving them wishing there could have been more."

The fifth season won four Saturn Awards – Best Network Television Series (tied with CSI: Crime Scene Investigation), Best Actor in a Television Series (David Boreanaz), Best Supporting Actor in a Television Series (James Marsters), and Best Supporting Actress in a Television Series (Amy Acker). While Alexis Denisof was nominated for Best Supporting Actor in a Television Series and Charisma Carpenter was nominated for Best Supporting Actress in a Television Series. The series, Marsters, and Acker also received nominations again in 2005.

"Smile Time" and "Not Fade Away" were nominated for the Hugo Award for Best Dramatic Presentation, Short Form.

The Futon Critic named "Lineage" the 32nd best episode of 2003, "Smile Time" the 21st best episode 2004 and "Not Fade Away" the 4th best episode of 2004.

The fifth season averaged 3.97 million viewers, slightly higher than season four.

Comic book continuation
After the success of the Buffy the Vampire Slayer Season Eight comic books, Joss Whedon announced a canonical comic book continuation of Angel would be published. Titled Angel: After the Fall, published by IDW Publishing, written by Brian Lynch (along with the help of Whedon), the book takes place after the events of the final episode, with Los Angeles in Hell. The first issue was released on November 21, 2007. Originally released as a 17-issue limited series, the book spawned into an ongoing spin-off series.

DVD release 
Angel: The Complete Fifth Season was released on DVD in region 1 on February 15, 2005 and in region 2 on February 21, 2005. The DVD includes all 22 episodes on 6 discs presented in anamorphic widescreen 1.78:1 aspect ratio. Special features on the DVD include seven commentary tracks—"Conviction" by writer/director Joss Whedon; "Destiny" by writers David Fury and Steven S. DeKnight, director Skip Schoolnik and actress Juliet Landau; "Soul Purpose" by writer Brent Fletcher, actor/director David Boreanaz and actor Christian Kane; "You're Welcome" by writer/director David Fury and actors Christian Kane and Sarah Thompson; "A Hole in the World" by writer/director Joss Whedon and actors Alexis Denisof and Amy Acker; "Underneath" by writers Elizabeth Craft and Sarah Fain, director Skip Schoolnik and actor Adam Baldwin; and "Not Fade Away" by co-writer/director Jeffrey Bell. Featurettes include, "Angel 100", a look at the 100th episode celebration party; "To Live & Die in L.A.: The Best of Angel", where Joss Whedon discusses the best episodes of the show; "Halos & Horns: Recurring Villainy", interviews with cast members who played villains over the course of the show; "Hey Kids! It's Smile Time", a featurette on the making of "Smile Time"; "Angel: Choreography of a Stunt", detailing the a performance of a stunt and interview with stunt coordinator Mike Massa; "Angel Unbound: The Gag Reels", a series of outtakes from all five seasons; and "Angel: The Final Season", a summary of the season featuring interviews with cast and crew members.

References

External links 
 

Angel (1999 TV series)
 
2003 American television seasons
2004 American television seasons